David Owen was an English footballer who played in the Football League for Darwen.

References

Year of birth unknown
Date of death unknown
English footballers
Darwen F.C. players
English Football League players
Association football midfielders